Kiruna Station is an ESTRACK radio antenna station for communication with spacecraft operated by the Swedish Space Corporation. It is located 38 km east of Kiruna, Sweden. The site hosts one 15 metre- and one 13-metre-diameter antenna, each with S- and X-band reception and S-band transmission. It also hosts a GPS-Tracking and Data Facility (TDF) antenna.

It is mainly used for the ERS-2, Envisat, and ASTRO-F missions.

See also
 Esrange Space Center

External links
 Kiruna station page
 ESA webpage on ESTRACK, including links to all stations

References

European Space Agency
ESTRACK facilities
Kiruna
Buildings and structures in Norrbotten County